A Propósito (By the Way) is the tenth studio album by Argentine rock band Babasónicos, released in May 2011.

Track listing

References 

2011 albums
Universal Music Latino albums
Babasónicos albums